Stone Creek is a village in Tuscarawas County, Ohio, United States. The population was 153 at the 2020 census.

Stone Creek has a youth baseball league called the Stone Creek Panthers, based on the name of mascot of the former high school.

History

In 1827, the first settlers purchased land in the area that would become the village of Stone Creek. A resident by the name of Philip Burrier hauled many loads of stone to create a passage across the swampy creek for horses and wagons to cross, so when a post office was established on the property of Michael Harmon in 1840, it was named Stone Creek. However, when the town was laid out by Phillip Leonhardt in 1854, he bestowed himself the honor of calling it Phillipsburg.

In 1904, village council members, Charlie Kughler and Fred Haas took the a train from the village to Akron to file incorporation papers for the village, only to discover that another Phillipsburg already existed in Ohio near Dayton. It was then they decided to name the village after the post office that had already been established there.

The Stone Creek Volunteer Fire Department was officially established in 1949. Before that, citizens of the village would come together to put out their neighbor's fires.

Stone Creek had a school called Stone Creek Jefferson School. The building was built in 1927 and closed in 1974. It operated as an independent school until 1965 when the school consolidated with the neighboring New Philadelphia City School District. The building was demolished on October 17, 1979.

Geography
Stone Creek is located at  (40.397391, -81.558933).

Transportation
Interstate 77 intersects Stone Creek, while SR 751 starts here.

Demographics

2020 census
As of the census of 2020, there were 153 people and 62 households living in the village.

2010 census

As of the census of 2010, there were 177 people, 65 households, and 54 families living in the village. The racial makeup of the village was 97.7% White, 0.6% African American, 0.6% from other races, and 1.1% from two or more races. Hispanic or Latino of any race were 0.6% of the population.

There were 65 households, of which 38.5% had children under the age of 18 living with them, 66.2% were married couples living together, 9.2% had a female householder with no husband present, 7.7% had a male householder with no wife present, and 16.9% were non-families. 12.3% of all households were made up of individuals, and 4.6% had someone living alone who was 65 years of age or older. The average household size was 2.72 and the average family size was 2.96.

The median age in the village was 35.5 years. 24.3% of residents were under the age of 18; 12.3% were between the ages of 18 and 24; 26.5% were from 25 to 44; 23.6% were from 45 to 64; and 13% were 65 years of age or older. The gender makeup of the village was 53.1% male and 46.9% female.

2000 census
As of the census of 2000, there were 184 people, 66 households, and 55 families living in the village. The population density was 426.9 people per square mile (165.2/km). There were 70 housing units at an average density of 162.4 per square mile (62.9/km). The racial makeup of the village was 100.00% White.

There were 66 households, out of which 47.0% had children under the age of 18 living with them, 66.7% were married couples living together, 10.6% had a female householder with no husband present, and 15.2% were non-families. 12.1% of all households were made up of individuals, and 9.1% had someone living alone who was 65 years of age or older. The average household size was 2.79 and the average family size was 3.05.

In the village, the population was spread out, with 32.6% under the age of 18, 7.6% from 18 to 24, 29.9% from 25 to 44, 14.7% from 45 to 64, and 15.2% who were 65 years of age or older. The median age was 34 years. For every 100 females there were 100.0 males. For every 100 females age 18 and over, there were 96.8 males.

The median income for a household in the village was $30,625, and the median income for a family was $31,250. Males had a median income of $35,625 versus $15,625 for females. The per capita income for the village was $15,308. About 10.0% of families and 8.8% of the population were below the poverty line, including 13.0% of those under the age of eighteen and 7.5% of those 65 or over.

References

Villages in Tuscarawas County, Ohio
Villages in Ohio